The 2014–15 Melbourne Stars season was the fourth in the club's history. Coached by Greg Shipperd and captained by Cameron White, they competed in the BBL's 2014–15 season.

Season

Ladder

Regular season

Semi-finals

Team information

Squad
Players with international caps are listed in bold.

Home attendance

References

External links
 Official website of the Melbourne Stars
 Official website of the Big Bash League

Melbourne Stars seasons